Choi Ki-young(Korean: 최기영; also known as Kiyoung Choi; born 1955) is a South Korean professor of electrical engineering at Seoul National University who served as Minister of Science and ICT under President Moon Jae-in from 2019 to 2021.

After working at now-LG Electronics (then Goldstar) and Cadence Design Systems, he return to his first alma mater. He took several roles in his faculty including the director of Neural Processing Research Center and Embedded Systems Research Center.

In 2017, he became a fellow of Institute of Electrical and Electronics Engineers.

He holds three degrees in electrical engineering - a bachelor from Seoul National University, a master's from KAIST and a doctorate from Stanford University.

He has a wife who is a professor of computer software at Hanyang University, a brother a professor of physics and astronomy at Seoul National University, a sister a retired professor of Chinese studies at Yonsei University.

References 

Academic staff of Seoul National University
Seoul National University alumni
KAIST alumni
Stanford University alumni
1955 births
Living people
Electrical engineering academics
People from Seoul
Science ministers